Boaram Festival is an annual harvest festival celebrated by the chiefs and people of Talensis in the Bongo Traditional Area in the Upper East  Region of Ghana. It is usually celebrated between the months of October and November.

Celebrations 
During the festival, sacrifices are made to the gods.

Significance 
The festival is celebrated to give thanks to the gods and ancestors after harvesting farm produce and for granting good health and strength throughout the farming season.

References 

Festivals in Ghana
Upper East Region